"Strangers Like Me" is a song by the English drummer Phil Collins for the soundtrack of Disney's 1999 animated film Tarzan. The song peaked at number ten on the U.S. Billboard Hot Adult Contemporary Tracks chart and received highly positive reviews. Collins also recorded the song in Spanish (Lo extraño que soy), Italian (Al di fuori di me), French (Je veux savoir) and German (Fremde wie ich). The song was later covered by the all-female pop rock band Everlife in 2004.

This song has also appeared in the film's Broadway musical.

Lyrics
The song talks about Tarzan's fascination with Jane, Professor Porter, and Clayton, as well as the wider human world he has yet to see. The song has a verse describing Tarzan's feelings for Jane.

Music video
The music video for the song was directed by Dani Jacobs and features Collins performing the song in a jungle, intercut with clips from Tarzan.

Track listings, formats, and versions

2005 CD
 "Strangers Like Me" (Phil Collins' Radio Mix Version)
 "Strangers Like Me" (Everlife Version) (From "Disney Mania 3")
 "Trashin' The Camp" (By: *NSYNC & Phil Collins)
 "Strangers Like Me" (Phil Collins' Radio Mix Version) (Video)
 "Strangers Like Me" (Everlife Version) (From "Disney Mania 3") (Video)

2005/1999 DVD Single

1999 Phil Colins' DVD Single
 "Strangers Like Me" (Phil Collins' Radio Mix Video)
 "Trashin' The Camp!" (Studio Session Music Video With *NSYNC & Phil Collins) (Video)

2005 Everlife DVD Single
 "Strangers Like Me" (Live) (From "Disney Mania 3") (Video)
 "Trashin' The Camp!" (Studio Session Music Video With *NSYNC & Phil Collins) (Repeat) (Video)
 Photo Gallery

2005 Enhanced VCD DualDisc Promo
CD Side
 "Strangers Like Me" (Phil Collins Radio Mix)
 "Strangers Like Me" (Everlife Version)
 "Trashin' The Camp!" (By: *NSYNC & Phil Collins)
DVD Side
 "Strangers Like Me" (Phil Collins Radio Mix' Version) (Music Video)
 "Strangers Like Me" (Everlife Version) (Live) (Music Video)
 "Trashin' The Camp!" (Studio Session Music Video With *NSYNC & Phil Collins)

Personnel 

 Phil Collins – lead and backing vocals, drums, keyboards
 Michael Landau – acoustic and electric guitar
 Nathan East – electric bass
 Mark Mancina – arrangements

Charts

Certifications

References

1999 singles
Phil Collins songs
Disney Renaissance songs
Songs from Disney's Tarzan
Songs written by Phil Collins
Songs written for animated films
Songs written for films
Walt Disney Records singles
1999 songs
Song recordings produced by Phil Collins
Song recordings produced by Rob Cavallo